"Are You Experienced?" is the title song for the Jimi Hendrix Experience 1967 debut album. It has been described as one of Jimi Hendrix's most original compositions on the album by music writer and biographer Keith Shadwick.  The song is largely based on one chord and has a drone-like quality reminiscent of Indian classical music.  It features recorded guitar and drum parts that are played backwards and a repeating piano octave.  Live recordings from 1968 are included on The Jimi Hendrix Concerts album and Winterland box set.

Recording and production
"Are You Experienced?" was recorded at London's Olympic Sound Studios on April 3, 1967, the final day of recording for Are You Experienced (along with the lead vocal for "Fire", overdubs for "Love or Confusion", and the master recordings of "Highway Chile" and "May This Be Love"). The backwards guitar track was recorded four times, with the last take being used for the final version. According to engineering assistant George Chkiantz, "The original idea [for the guitar recording] was to do a loop, but that gave a problem ... we tried looping it and then we couldn't get it to loop ... in the end Jimi got so impatient doing this, he said 'look, it's quite easy, we're just gonna play' and played it in". It is also possible that Hendrix performed some of the backwards drum parts on the song in addition to drummer Mitch Mitchell.

Biographer Keith Shadwick notes the song's droning quality, which he compares to Indian classical music. Although he believes the song does not include a bass guitar line (further underscoring the Indian approach), bassist Noel Redding is listed on some albums. An earlier instrumental take of the song recorded the same day included Redding's bass pushed more forward in the mix.

Composition and lyrics
Hendrix historians Harry Shapiro and Caesar Glebbeek have praised "Are You Experienced?" as "a majestic setpiece of declamatory anthem rock":

Live performances
Despite its studio complexity, "Are You Experienced?" was performed live by Experience several times in 1967 and 1968. It was used as the closing number at a Saville Theatre show in London on June 4, 1967.  According to a review by Disc and Music Echo, the rendition of the Are You Experienced was "smashing [and] ear splitting".  Hendrix "ended the gig by smashing a guitar handed to him for the finale ... and hurling it into the audience".  The show was dubbed a "farewell" concert by Shapiro and Glebbeek,  before the band headed to the US and their appearance at the Monterey Pop Festival.

A performance recorded at the Winterland Ballroom in San Francisco, California, on October 10, 1968, was released on the 1982 The Jimi Hendrix Concerts album.  A second performance on October 11 was included on a bonus disc for Live at Winterland, with Virgil Gonzales' flute part edited out.  In 2011, the song was included on the Winterland box set.

Releases and other renditions
The original song is included on the 2001 posthumous compilation album Voodoo Child: The Jimi Hendrix Collection, while a previously unreleased take is featured on the 2010 box set West Coast Seattle Boy: The Jimi Hendrix Anthology.

Devo version

American rock band Devo recorded "Are You Experienced?" for their sixth studio album, Shout.  It was released as the album's lead single (stylized as "Are U X-perienced?" on the picture sleeve) and includes the non-album track, "Growing Pains", as its B-side (which was also released as a bonus track on CD release of the album). Their adaptation carried on the Devo tradition of radically transforming notable songs, which began with their 1978 cover of the Rolling Stones song "(I Can't Get No) Satisfaction."

Promotional music video
A lavish video for "Are You Experienced?" was produced by the band in conjunction with Ivan Stang of the Church of the SubGenius. The video includes Devo as floating blobs of wax in a lava lamp and Jimi Hendrix (played by Hendrix impersonator Randy Hansen) stepping out of his coffin to play a guitar solo, and the cover children Zachary Chase and Alex Mothersbaugh.

Despite being one of Devo's most visually complex and expensive music videos, costing about $90,000 to produce, it was not included on the 2003 DVD music video collection The Complete Truth About De-Evolution (although it had been included on the LaserDisc of the same name issued in 1993). In an interview, group co-founder and bass guitarist Gerald Casale explained:

Notes

References

1967 songs
American psychedelic rock songs
The Jimi Hendrix Experience songs
Devo songs
Songs written by Jimi Hendrix
Song recordings produced by Chas Chandler